Møller  is a Danish surname, referring to an occupation as a Miller, equivalent of the Scottish/English Miller, the German Müller etc.
Møller is the twentieth commonest surname in Denmark. It is the most common non-patronymic surname.

Danish immigrants to English-speaking countries often anglicized the name to Miller, Moller, or Moeller.

Persons
 Anders Møller Christensen
 Arnold Peter Møller (1876–1965), Danish shipping magnate and founder of the A.P. Moller-Maersk Group
 Arvid Møller (1939-2020), Norwegian journalist and non-fiction writer
 Birger Møller-Pedersen
 Cæsar Peter Møller Boeck
 Carl Møller
 Christian Møller (1904–1980), Danish physicist
 Erik Møller (1909–2002), Danish architect
 Grethe Fenger Møller (born 1941), Danish politician
 Gunner Møller Pedersen
 Hans Peter Christian Møller (1810–1845), Danish malacologist and Inspector of North Greenland
 Ida Møller (1872–1947), Danish operatic soprano
 Johan Møller Warmedal
 John Christmas Møller (1894–1948), Danish politician
 Katti Anker Møller
 Kenneth Heiner-Møller
 Kenneth Møller Pedersen
 Lis Møller (1918–1983), Danish journalist and politician
 M. P. Moller
 Mærsk Mc-Kinney Møller (1913–2012), Danish shipping magnate
 Marc Møller
 Michael Møller (born 1952), Danish diplomat, Director-General of United Nations Office at Geneva (2013-)
 Niels Otto Møller
 Per Stig Møller (born 1942), Danish politician, Foreign Minister (2001–)
 Peder Møller (disambiguation)
 Peder Møller (gymnast)
 Peder Ludvig Møller
 Peter Møller (born 1972), Danish former professional footballer
 Pia Christmas-Møller
 Poul Martin Møller (1794–1838), Danish professor of philosophy and author
 Richard Møller Nielsen
 Sunniva Hakestad Møller

References

Danish-language surnames
Occupational surnames